TIPA is a free software package providing International Phonetic Alphabet and other phonetic character capabilities for TeX and LaTeX. In 2018, the TeX TIPA Roman font was selected as best representing the IPA symbol set by the International Phonetic Association's Alphabet, Charts and Fonts committee.

TIPA characters are placed within a LaTeX document using any of the following ways: \textipa{...}, {\tipaencoding ...}, or \begin{IPA} ... \end{IPA}.

TIPA supports the symbols in the Phonetic Symbol Guide (though macros are sometimes required) as well as a few idiosyncratic ones, such as a small-capital  and an  ligature .

Examples

\textipa{[""Ekspl@"neIS@n]}

\textipa{/f@"nEtIks/}

See also
Phonetic transcription
 List of TeX extensions

References

External links

TIPA manual (PDF)

Free TeX software